1st Guards Army may refer to:
1st Guards Army (Soviet Union)
1st Guards Tank Army (Soviet Union)